Newington West was a parliamentary constituency in  the Newington area of South London.  It returned one Member of Parliament (MP) to the House of Commons of the Parliament of the United Kingdom, elected by the first past the post system.

History 
The constituency was created by the Redistribution of Seats Act 1885 for the 1885 general election. It was abolished for the 1918 general election, although the new constituency of Southwark Central had very similar boundaries.

Boundaries 
Part of St Mary's ward and Trinity and St Paul's ward.

Members of Parliament

Election results

Elections in the 1880s

Elections in the 1890s

Elections in the 1900s

Elections in the 1910s 

General Election 1914–15:

Another General Election was required to take place before the end of 1915. The political parties had been making preparations for an election to take place and by the July 1914, the following candidates had been selected; 
Liberal:Cecil Norton
Unionist:

Notes and references 

 Debrett’s Illustrated Heraldic and Biographical House of Commons and the Judicial Bench 1886
 Debrett’s House of Commons and the Judicial Bench 1901
 Debrett’s House of Commons and the Judicial Bench 1918

Parliamentary constituencies in London (historic)
Constituencies of the Parliament of the United Kingdom established in 1885
Constituencies of the Parliament of the United Kingdom disestablished in 1918
Politics of the London Borough of Southwark